Litvinov or Litvinoff is a Russian surname derived from the term Litvin, meaning Lithuanian person (Litva/Литвa). The female form of this surname is Litvinova.

Notable persons with that name include:

Litvinov
 Alexander Litvinov (1853–1932), Russian general in the Imperial Russian Army and the Red Army
 Venya D'rkin (stage name - real name Alexander Litvinov, 1970-1999), bard musician, artist, and storyteller
 David Litvinoff (AKA David Litvinov, 1928-75), consultant for the British film industry who traded on his knowledge of the low life of the East End of London
 Dmitry Litvinov (1854–1929), Russian botanist
 Emanuel Litvinoff (1915–2011), British writer and editor
 Eugene Litvinov (1950 – 2020), American engineer
 Ivy Low Litvinov (1889 – 1977), English-Russian writer and translator
 Juri Litvinov (born 1978), Kazakhstani figure skater
 Maxim Litvinov (1876–1951), Soviet diplomat
 Pavel Litvinov (born 1940), Soviet physicist, writer, and human rights supporter
 Sergey Litvinov (disambiguation), several persons
 Victor Litvinov (1910–83), Russian aircraft designer
 Vitali Litvinov (born 1970), Russian former footballer

Litvinova
 Elizaveta Litvinova (1845–1919), Russian mathematician
 Larisa Litvinova (1918-1997), World War II bomber navigator and Hero of the Soviet Union
 Lyudmila Litvinova (born 1985), Russian sprinter and Olympic medallist
 Renata Litvinova (born 1967), Russian actress

See also
 
 Litvin
 Litvin (surname)
 Litwin
 Litwinki (disambiguation)
 Litwinowicz
 Litvak (disambiguation)
 Lytovchenko
 Littauer
 Lytvynenko
 Litvinchuk

Russian-language surnames
Surnames of Lithuanian origin
Jewish surnames
Ethnonymic surnames